The 2001 Italian Open also known as 2001 Rome Masters was a tennis tournament played on outdoor clay courts. It was the 58th edition of the Italian Open and was part of the Tennis Masters Series of the 2001 ATP Tour and of Tier I of the 2001 WTA Tour. Both the men's and women's events took place at the Foro Italico in Rome in Italy. The men's tournament was played from May 7 through May 13, 2001 while the women's tournament was played from May 14 through May 20, 2001.

Finals

Men's singles

 Juan Carlos Ferrero defeated  Gustavo Kuerten 3–6, 6–1, 2–6, 6–4, 6–2
 It was Ferrero's 4th title of the year and the 5th of his career. It was his 1st Masters title.

Women's singles

 Jelena Dokić defeated  Amélie Mauresmo 7–6(7–3), 6–1
 It was Dokić's 1st title of her career.

Men's doubles

 Wayne Ferreira /  Yevgeny Kafelnikov defeated  Daniel Nestor /  Sandon Stolle 6–4, 7–6(8–6)
 It was Ferreira's 2nd title of the year and the 24th of his career. It was Kafelnikov's 3rd title of the year and the 46th of his career.

Women's doubles

 Cara Black /  Elena Likhovtseva defeated  Paola Suárez /  Patricia Tarabini 6–1, 6–1
 It was Black's 3rd title of the year and the 4th of her career. It was Likhovtseva's 3rd title of the year and the 12th of her career.

References

External links
 Official website  
 Official website 
 ATP Tournament Profile
 WTA Tournament Profile

Italian Open
Italian Open
 
2001 Italian Open (Tennis)
Italian Open